Eugene Isaac Meyer (October 31, 1875 – July 17, 1959) was an American financier and newspaper publisher. Through his public career, he served as the 5th chairman of the Federal Reserve from 1930 to 1933 and was the first president of the World Bank Group from June to December 1946. Meyer published The Washington Post from 1933 to 1946, and the paper stayed in his family throughout the rest of the 20th century.

His daughter, Katharine "Kay" Graham, took the Post over in 1963 and remained its titular head until her death in 2001.

Early life
Meyer was born to a Jewish family in Los Angeles, California, descended from a long line of rabbis and civic leaders. He was one of eight children of Harriet (née Newmark) and Marc Eugene Meyer. His mother was the daughter of Joseph Newmark. He grew up in San Francisco and attended college across the bay at the University of California, Berkeley, but he dropped out after one year and later enrolled at Yale University.  He earned a bachelor's degree in 1895.

Career

In finance
After college, Meyer went to work for Lazard Frères, where his father was a partner, but quit in 1901 after four years and went out on his own. He was a successful investor and speculator, and owned a seat on the New York Stock Exchange. He married Agnes Elizabeth Ernst, a Lutheran, in 1910; they had five children, including the future Katharine Graham, and another daughter, Florence Meyer (Mrs. Oskar Homolka). By 1915, when he was forty, he was worth $40 million.

In 1920, Meyer teamed with William H. Nichols of General Chemical to help fulfill his vision of a bigger, better chemical company. Meyer and Nichols combined five smaller chemical companies to create the Allied Chemical & Dye Corporation, which later became Allied Chemical Corp., which in turn became part of AlliedSignal, the forerunner of Honeywell’s specialty materials business. Both men have buildings named after them at Honeywell’s Morris Plains, New Jersey, headquarters.

In banking

Chairman of the Federal Reserve
Meyer went to Washington, D.C., during World War I as a "dollar-a-year man" (his token salary) for Woodrow Wilson, becoming the head of the War Finance Corporation and serving there long after the end of hostilities. President Calvin Coolidge named him as chairman of the Federal Farm Loan Board in 1927.

Herbert Hoover promoted him to Chairman of the Federal Reserve Board in 1930. He took on an additional half-year post in 1932 as chief of the new Reconstruction Finance Corporation, which was Hoover's unsuccessful attempt to aid companies by providing loans to businesses. After Franklin D. Roosevelt became president, Meyer resigned his Fed position on May 10, 1933.

Meyer has been criticized as Fed Chairman for not attacking the economic catastrophe of the early 1930s with monetary stimulus, thus allowing the banking crisis to get out of hand and deepening the economic collapse. One of his biggest critics at the time condemned Meyer along with J. P. Morgan, Andrew Mellon and Ogden Mills
as being the Four Horsemen of the Apocalypse.
More recent critics include Nobel laureate Milton Friedman and his fellow economist Anna Schwartz who, in their landmark book A Monetary History of the United States, put forth the argument that the Fed could have lessened the severity of the Depression, but failed to exercise its role of managing the monetary system and ameliorating banking panics.

In publishing

Purchase of the Washington Post
In 1929, Meyer made an offer of $5 million for The Washington Post, but he was rebuffed. In June 1933, he bought the paper at a bankruptcy auction for $825,000, the paper having been ruined by its spendthrift socialite owner Ned McLean, and by the Great Depression. Meyer had resigned as Fed chairman just three weeks earlier, and he had no experience in the publishing business. But he was prepared to bid up to $2 million for the Post, far more than the other bidders, including William Randolph Hearst. Preferring to remain anonymous, Meyer stayed home from the proceedings. After weeks of speculation when even his daughter Katharine didn't know the buyer's name, it was finally revealed in newspapers around the country on June 13.

In his statement to the press, Meyer vowed to improve the Post, and asserted that he would operate it independently. He also said that he had bought the Post on his own, without the influence of "any person, group or organization." He made this statement to contradict the rumors that as a well-known Republican, he would soon turn it into a voice for Republican causes. Press reaction to the purchase was positive, with other newspapers being pleased that the Post would not go out of business, and would continue to report the news from the nation's capital; given its important location, said one editorial, rescuing the Post was "a public service."

An editorial in a newspaper that was identifiably Republican praised the purchase as "good news for journalism." While expressing the hope that Meyer would in fact take the Republican point of view, the editorial acknowledged that he probably would not do so, since he seemed to be "no slavish supporter of any party or leader," assuring that under his leadership the Washington Post would be "hard hitting and independent, a paper that nobody can ignore." As it turned out, Meyer did take the side of the Republican party on some issues. He was opposed to FDR's New Deal, and this was reflected in the Post's editorial stance as well as its news coverage, especially regarding the National Recovery Administration (NRA). He even wrote an editorializing "news" story under a fake name.

Over the next twenty years, Meyer spent millions of dollars of his own money to keep the money-losing paper in business, while focusing on improving its quality; by the 1950s, it was finally consistently profitable and was increasingly recognized for good reporting and important editorials.  As publisher, Meyer occasionally contributed to stories:  his friendship with the British Ambassador, Lord Lothian, led to a Washington Post scoop on reporting of Edward VIII's relationship with Wallis Simpson.

World Bank
After World War II, Harry S. Truman named Meyer, then 70 years old, to be the first head of the World Bank in June 1946.  Meyer appointed his son-in-law, Phil Graham, as publisher of the Post. After six months with the World Bank, Meyer returned to the Post, serving as chairman of the Washington Post Company until his death in Mount Kisco, New York in 1959.

Personal life

Meyer's older sister, Florence Meyer Blumenthal, was noted for the philanthropic organization she formed, the Franco-American Florence Blumenthal Foundation, which awarded the Prix Blumenthal.

Legacy
Eugene Meyer Elementary School in Washington, DC was named in his honor in 1963. It closed in 2008 and the building has been used as swing space by the school system ever since.

References
Notes

Bibliography
Agnes E. Meyer.  Out of These Roots.  1959.
Merlo J. Pusey.  Eugene Meyer.  1974.
Katharine Graham.  Personal History. 1997.

External links

 Biography of Eugene Meyer (website)
 Statements and Speeches of Eugene Meyer
 Selections from the Eugene Meyer Papers relating to the Federal Reserve, from the Library of Congress

1875 births
1959 deaths
American financiers
American investors
American newspaper publishers (people)
American stock traders
Businesspeople from Los Angeles
Chairs of the Federal Reserve
Lowell High School (San Francisco) alumni
Newmark family
Presidents of the World Bank Group
Reconstruction Finance Corporation
The Washington Post publishers
Washington, D.C., Republicans
Yale University alumni
Hoover administration personnel
Franklin D. Roosevelt administration personnel
American people of French descent